The 1994 East Texas State Lions football team represented East Texas State University—now known as Texas A&M University–Commerce—as a member of the Lone Star Conference (LSC) during the 1994 NCAA Division II football season. Led by ninth-year head coach Eddie Vowell, the Lions compiled an overall record of 5–5 with a mark of 2–3 in conference play, placing fourth in the LSC. The team played its home games at Memorial Stadium in Commerce, Texas.

Schedule

Postseason awards

All-Americans
Chris Dolan, Punter, Third Team
LeRance Shaw, Linebacker, Third Team
Daryl Anderson, Wide Receiver, Honorable Mention
Bobby Connelly, Offensive Guard, Honorable Mention
Marcus Gates, Cornerback, Honorable Mention
Kevin Mathis, Cornerback, Honorable Mention

All-Lone Star Conference

LSC First Team
Chris Dolan, Punter
LaRance Shaw, Linebacker

LSC Second Team
Daryl Anderson, Wide Receiver 
Bobby Connelly, Offensive Guard
Trent Dagen, Tight End
Jerry Epps, Defensive Tackle
Marcus Gates, Cornerback 
Kevin Mathis, Cornerback

LSC Honorable Mention
Chandler Evans, Quarterback
Brian Jones, Offensive Tackle 
Michael Kelly, Running Back
Margene Simmons, Linebacker
Jason Smith, Running Back
Jim Suiter, Offensive Tackle  
Carl Walker, Defensive Line

References

East Texas State
Texas A&M–Commerce Lions football seasons
East Texas State Lions football